Teddy Briggs (16 July 1909 – 29 August 1963) was an  Australian rules footballer who played with North Melbourne in the Victorian Football League (VFL).

Notes

External links 

1909 births
1963 deaths
Australian rules footballers from Victoria (Australia)
North Melbourne Football Club players